The Next Dawn is the second studio album by Claire Kuo.  It was released on 9 May 2008 by Linfair Records.

Track listing
The Next Dawn / 下一個天亮
100% / 百分百
A Big Joke / 大玩笑
Love Message / 愛情訊息
Slowly Commemorates / 慢慢紀念
No Cure / 不藥而癒
Echo / 回音
Know / 知道 (Zhīdào)
Boundary Line / 界線
Sick / 感冒

DVD
The Next Dawn / 下一個天亮 MV
100% / 百分百 MV
No Cure / 不藥而癒 MV
A Big Joke / 大玩笑 MV
Know / 知道 MV

References
The album on Linfair Records website

Claire Kuo albums
2008 albums